Vladimir Andonov (born 16 August 1975) is a retired Bulgarian footballer.

He played for CSKA Sofia in his home country. Later playing for Bnei Yehuda Tel Aviv from 2001 to 2003, he had a short spell in Levski Sofia before returning to Israel where he played for Hapoel Be'er Sheva and Maccabi Petah Tikva until 2005.

References

1975 births
Living people
Bulgarian footballers
PFC CSKA Sofia players
PFC Levski Sofia players
Bnei Yehuda Tel Aviv F.C. players
Hapoel Be'er Sheva F.C. players
Maccabi Petah Tikva F.C. players
First Professional Football League (Bulgaria) players
Israeli Premier League players
Bulgarian expatriate footballers
Expatriate footballers in Israel
Bulgarian expatriate sportspeople in Israel
Association football midfielders